The 2020 Michelin Ginetta Junior Championship was a multi-event, one make motor racing championship held across England and Scotland. The championship featured a mix of professional teams and privately funded drivers, aged between 14 and 17, competing in Ginetta G40s that conformed to the technical regulations for the championship. It formed part of the extensive program of support categories built up around the British Touring Car Championship centrepiece. It was the fourteenth Ginetta Junior Championship, commencing on 1 August 2020 at Donington Park and concluding on 15 November 2020 at Brands Hatch, utilising the Grand Prix circuit. After nine meetings, all in support of the 2020 British Touring Car Championship, Tom Lebbon was crowned champion.

Teams and Drivers

Race Calendar 

Calendar Changes

The Ginetta Junior Championship will not support every round of the British Touring Car Championship in 2020. The series will miss the third round of the BTCC season, Oulton Park.

Championship standings

Drivers' championship
A driver's best 19 scores counted towards the championship, with any other points being discarded.

References 

Ginetta Junior Championship season
Ginetta Junior Championship seasons